Anjorin is a surname. Notable people with the surname include:

 Liz Anjorin, Nigerian actress
 Tino Anjorin (born 2001), English footballer

See also
 Anjori Alagh, Indian actress and model

Surnames of Nigerian origin